Stefan Pfannmöller (born 4 December 1980, in Halle an der Saale) is a German slalom canoeist who competed at the international level from 1997 to 2007. Competing in two Summer Olympics, he won a bronze medal in the C1 event in Athens in 2004.

Pfannmöller also won five medals at the ICF Canoe Slalom World Championships with a gold (C1 team: 2006), three silvers (C1 team: 1999, 2002, 2005), and a bronze (C1: 2003).

He is the overall World Cup champion in the C1 class from 2002. At the European Championships he won a total of six medals (2 golds and 4 silvers).

World Cup individual podiums

1 European Championship counting for World Cup points

References

Database Olympics

1980 births
Canoeists at the 2000 Summer Olympics
Canoeists at the 2004 Summer Olympics
German male canoeists
Living people
Olympic canoeists of Germany
Olympic bronze medalists for Germany
Sportspeople from Halle (Saale)
Olympic medalists in canoeing
Medalists at the 2004 Summer Olympics
Medalists at the ICF Canoe Slalom World Championships